Arctic View is the name of a viewpoint and restaurant located on the northwestern tip of the island of Havøya in Måsøy Municipality in Finnmark county, Norway.

On the way to Arctic View, one drives through a wind farm that was built by Norsk Hydro. Here, at the edge of the Barents Sea, there is a view of the western part of Finmark county, and the place is a popular spot to watch the midnight sun, which can be seen from May 14 to July 31. The sun reaches its lowest point at 12:14–12:24 a.m.

Arctic View is owned by Måsøy Municipality and it is a cooperation between the municipality and the companies Arctic Wind, Repvåg Kraftlag, Asplan Viak, and NCC Norway.

References

External links
Official site

Geography of Norway